Free Reign is the seventh studio album by English rock band Clinic. It was released in November 2012 under Domino Records.

Track list

References

2012 albums
Domino Recording Company albums
Clinic (band) albums